Li'l Folks, the first comic strip by Peanuts creator Charles M. Schulz, was a weekly panel that appeared mainly in Schulz's hometown paper, the St. Paul Pioneer Press, from June 22, 1947, to January 22, 1950. Schulz's first regular cartoon, Li'l Folks can be regarded as an embryonic version of Peanuts, containing characters and themes which were to reappear in the later strip: a well-dressed young boy with a fondness for Beethoven, à la Schroeder; a dog with a resemblance to Snoopy; and a boy named Charlie Brown.

Publication history 
Schulz was 24 at the time he began drawing Li'l Folks, and he was living with his father in a four-bedroom apartment above his father's barber shop. He earned $10 for each submission to the paper.

The first two installments of Li'l Folks ran June 8 and 15, 1947, in the Minneapolis Tribune.  It then moved to the St. Paul Pioneer Press; Li'l Folks ran in the women's section of the paper.

In 1948, Schulz tried to have Li'l Folks syndicated through the Newspaper Enterprise Association (a Scripps Company). He would have been an independent contractor for the syndicate, unheard of in the 1940s, but the deal fell through.

Schulz quit two years into the strip after the editor turned down his requests for a pay increase and a move of Li'l Folks from the women's section to the comics pages.

Later that year, Schulz approached the United Feature Syndicate (also a Scripps Company) with Li'l Folks, and the syndicate became interested. However, by that time Schulz had also developed a comic strip (also called Li'l Folks), typically using four panels rather than one. The strip was similar in spirit to the panel comic, but it had a set cast of characters, rather than different nameless little folk for each page. The syndicate preferred the strip; however, the name Li'l Folks was too close to the names of two other comics of the time: Al Capp's Li'l Abner and a strip titled Little Folks. To avoid confusion, the syndicate chose the name Peanuts, after the peanut gallery featured in the Howdy Doody TV show. Peanuts made its first appearance on October 2, 1950, in seven newspapers.

Characters and story 
Li'l Folks saw the first use of the name Charlie Brown on May 30, 1948, although Schulz applied the name in four gags to three different boys, as well as one buried in sand, during 1948–1949. The strip also featured a dog named Rover that looked much like Snoopy. Like most of Peanuts, adult characters were not shown in the strip.

Collected editions 
The newspaper never returned Schulz's original artwork, so he clipped each week's strip from the paper and placed it in his scrapbook, which eventually housed over 7,000 pieces of artwork.

In 2004, the complete run of the strip was collected by the Charles M. Schulz Museum and Research Center (Santa Rosa, California) in a book, Li'l Beginnings, by Derrick Bang with a foreword by Jean Schulz. It is available from the Museum and distributed by Fantagraphics Books. The complete run of the strip was also included in the penultimate volume of The Complete Peanuts, published in May 2016 by Fantagraphics Books.

References

American comic strips
1947 comics debuts
1950 comics endings
Charles M. Schulz
Child characters in comics
Gag cartoon comics
Comics characters introduced in 1947